The Spring Scream is an outdoor music festival held in early April each year at Kenting, Pingtung County, Taiwan. The festival showcases a variety of music styles from bands both from Taiwan and overseas.  Each year the festival adds the name of the current Chinese astrological animal to its name. The festival is organized by two expatriate Americans, Wade Davis and Jimi Moe, and has grown significantly since its beginnings in 1995.

The event length has been between 2 and 11 days and as many as 300 acts on 8 stages.  It also features a film festival, art exhibits, DJs, stalls, food vendors and camping.

Spring Scream History

1995
Year of the Pig (豬年) 3 days, Magic Studios
 Bands had their own stalls, with hand-dyed and printed shirts

1996
Year of the Rat (鼠年) 2 days, Magic Studios
Cover:$200
30 bands on 2 stages
Stalls improved, with hand-dyed and printed shirts, and artists-submitted designs for shirts

1997
Year of the Ox (牛年) 3 days, Beach
Cover:$200
 30 bands on 2 stages

1998
Year of the Tiger (虎年) 3 days, Beach 
Cover:$500
70 bands on 2 stages. Broadcast on MTV Asia. Concert enjoyed widespread media coverage
Organizers required all bands to have at least one original song

1999
Year of the Rabbit (兔年) 4 days, LiouFu Campground
Cover:$500
80 bands on 5 stages
Organizers required all music to be only original songs, and handed out free CDs or mp3 demo songs of bands performing
 This was the last year that bands cooked for other bands

2000
Year of the Dragon (龍年) 4 days, LiouFu Campground
Cover:$1,000. 
120 bands. 
 Media got free passes. 
Organizers again gave out free CDs of mp3 demo songs of bands performing
 This was the last year the volunteers had to cook and clean toilets

2001
Year of the Snake (蛇年) 4 days, LiouFu Campground
Cover:$1,000.
 120 bands. 
Organizers gave out free CDs of mp3 demo songs plus pictures of bands performing. 
 First year some of the stages were covered.

2002
Year of the Horse (馬年) 4 days, LiouFu Campground
Cover:$1,000. 
150 bands.

2003
Year of the Goat (羊年) 4 days, LiouFu Campground
Cover:$1,500
160 bands

2004
Year of the Monkey (猴年) 11 days, LiouFu Campground
Cover:$1,500
 200 bands
 Organizers gave out free DVDs of mp3 demo songs and pictures from all bands who applied to play
 Start of the film festival contest

2005
Year of the Rooster (雞年) 4 days, LiouFu Campground 
Cover:$1,500
160 Bands
Start of the poster contest and the logo contest

2006
Year of the Dog (狗年) 4 days, LiouFu Campground 
Cover:$1,500
160 bands

2007
Year of the Pig (豬年) 4 days, Erluanbi and ShauKenting Rodeo
Cover:$1,500
230 bands
Added pop artists who do original compositions

2008
Year of the Rat (鼠年) 4 days, Erluanbi Lighthouse Area.
Cover: $1,600
270 bands

See also
Taiwanese rock

External links
 Official festival website
 Taipei Times 2005 preview
 Far Eastern Audio Review coverage of 2005 festival
 Comme les Chinois: How-to guide for Kenting during Spring Scream (1 of 3)
 Kenting National Park Website

1995 establishments in Taiwan
Rock festivals in Taiwan
Taiwanese culture
Tourist attractions in Pingtung County
Music festivals established in 1995
Spring (season) events in Taiwan